Jorinji Bosai Dam is an earthfill dam located in Gifu Prefecture in Japan. The dam is used for flood control. The catchment area of the dam is 2 km2. The dam impounds about 5  ha of land when full and can store 295 thousand cubic meters of water. The construction of the dam was completed in 1964.

References

Dams in Gifu Prefecture
1964 establishments in Japan